The Hawk in Paris is an album by saxophonist Coleman Hawkins featuring compositions related to Paris performed with an orchestra arranged and conducted by Manny Albam which was recorded in 1956 for the RCA Records subsidiary Vik label.

Reception

Scott Yanow of AllMusic states, "Manny Albam's arrangements mostly avoid being muzaky and quite often are creative and witty. What could have been a novelty or an insipid affair is actually one of Coleman Hawkins's more memorable albums".

Track listing
 "April in Paris" (Vernon Duke, Yip Harburg) – 3:53
 "Mon Homme" (Jacques Charles, Channing Pollock, Albert Willemetz, Maurice Yvain) – 3:19
 "Under Paris Skies" (Hubert Giraud, Jean Dréjac) – 2:46
 "Mimi" (Richard Rodgers, Lorenz Hart) – 3:08
 "La Chnouf" (Marc Lanjean) – 3:07
 "La Vie en Rose" (Louiguy, Édith Piaf, Mack David) – 2:37
 "La Mer" (Charles Trenet) – 3:33
 "Paris in the Spring" (Harry Revel, Gordon) – 3:15
 "I Love Paris" (Cole Porter) – 3:31
 "Mademoiselle de Paree" (Eric Maschwitz, Paul Durand) – 3:19
 "Chiens Perdus Sans Collier (The Little Lost Dog)" (Paul Misraki) – 2:58
 "Tu N' Peux T' Figurer (Dawn over Paris)" (Misraki) – 3:22

Personnel
Coleman Hawkins – tenor saxophone
Manny Albam – arranger, conductor
Romeo Penque – saxophone, flute
Al Epstein – saxophone
Nick Travis – trumpet
Urbie Green, Chauncey Welsch – trombone
Ray Beckenstein – flute
Tosha Samaroff, Paul Gershman, Leo Kruczek, Max Cahn, Alvin Rudintsky, Jack Zayde, Sy Miroff – violin
Lucien Schmit, George Ricci, Pete Makis – cello
Janet Putnam – harp
Marty Wilson – vibraphone
Hank Jones – piano
Barry Galbraith – guitar
Arnold Fishkind – bass
Osie Johnson – drums

References

Coleman Hawkins albums
1957 albums
RCA Records albums
Albums arranged by Manny Albam
Albums conducted by Manny Albam